Cherry Ripe is a romance novel by the British writer Ellen Buckingham Mathews under her pen name of Helen Matthews, which was first published in 1878. Like much of her other work it is a sentimental rural romance, with shades of melodrama.

Film adaptation
In 1921, the book was turned into a silent film Cherry Ripe directed by Kenelm Foss and starring Mary Odette.

References

Bibliography
 Low, Rachael. History of the British Film, 1918-1929. George Allen & Unwin, 1971.

1878 British novels
British novels adapted into films
British romance novels
Novels by Ellen Buckingham Mathews
Novels set in England
Contemporary romance novels